The 2017–18 Copa Federación de España was the 25th edition of the Copa Federación de España, also known as Copa RFEF, a knockout competition for Spanish football clubs in Segunda División B and Tercera División. Pontevedra won the tournament after winning 1–0 on aggregate score to Ontinyent.

The champion won the trophy, a cash prize of €90,152 and the qualification for the next year tournament. The runner-up received a cash prize of €30,051 and every semifinalist €12,020. Additionally, each winner of autonomous community tournament  received €3,005.

The competition began in late July 2017 with the first games of the Regional stages and finished 11 April 2018 with the national final.

Regional tournaments

West Andalusia and Ceuta tournament
The draw was made 4 August.

Semifinal

Final

Match was abandoned at halftime after power failure and Algeciras renounced to continue the match.

East Andalusia and Melilla tournament
Huétor Tájar was the only registered team and qualified directly for national phase.

Aragon tournament
For the 2017–18 edition, the Aragonese Football Federation agreed to change the competition format to two groups of four teams, where after a single-leg round robin tournament, the two group winners will qualify to the Regional final.

Group 1

Group 2

Final

Asturias tournament
The twelve qualified teams were divided into four groups of three teams, where the winners will qualify for the semifinals. Teams were be drawn according to their league positions in the previous season.

The final will be played at Estadio El Bayu, Siero, as part of the celebrations of the 100th anniversary of Club Siero.

Group 1

Group 2

Group 3

Group 4

Final bracket

Final

Balearic Islands tournament

Final

Basque Country tournament
Four teams of the Group 4 of Tercera División and two of Segunda División B registered for the tournament (Alavés B, Amorebieta, Amurrio, Gernika, Getxo and R. Sociedad C). Tournament will be played in two stages, the first with two groups of three teams and the winner will play the final over two matches. The group stage phase was drawn on 4 September by Basque Football Federation.

Group 1

Group 2

Final

Canary Islands tournament

Final

Cantabria tournament
Teams qualified between second and ninth place in 2016–17 Tercera División Group 3 registered for playing the competition. The bracket was drawn on 2 August. Quarter-finals and Semi-finals were played in Santa Cruz de Bezana.

Final

Castile-La Mancha tournament
The Castile-La Mancha Football Federation announced the Copa Junta de Comunidades de Castilla La Mancha as the regional Copa RFEF qualifying tournament.

Final

Castile and León tournament
The Castile and León Football Federation made the draw of the tournament on 6 September 2017.

The semifinal between Ávila and Real Burgos was canceled by the regional Football Federation due to not having the seconds enough players for playing this tournament.

Final

Catalonia tournament
Three teams joined the regional tournament, consisted in a single-game knockout tournament.

Final

Extremadura tournament
A record of 17 teams played the tournament, consisting in a single-game knockout tournament. The preliminary round and the round of 16 were firstly drawn, and later each round was drawn independently.

Final

Galicia tournament
Eleven teams registered for playing the competition. The bracket was drawn on 13 July.

Teams were divided into two brackets according to geographical criteria and all matches were played at the stadium of the team that plays in a lower division. The federation paid €3,005 to the winner of the competition.

Final

La Rioja tournament
Seven teams will play the regional tournament, consisted in a single-game knockout tournament.

Final

Madrid tournament

Final

Murcia tournament

Final

Navarre tournament
The competition was played in two stages: the first one as a group stage and the final as a single match. The groups were drawn on 5 July 2017.

Group 1

Group 2

Final

Valencian Community tournament
The competition will be played in three rounds, the first as a single match and semi-finals and final with home and away matches. The draw was on 11 August 2017.

Final

National tournament
The national tournament began 29 November 2017.

Qualified teams

Defending champion
 Atlético Saguntino (3)

Teams losing Copa del Rey first round
 Arcos (4)
 Avilés (4)
 Badalona (3)
 Cacereño (4)
 Gimnástica Torrelavega (4)
 Melilla (3)
 Olímpic (4)
 Peña Sport (3)
 Pontevedra (3)
 Racing Santander (3)
 Rápido de Bouzas (3)
 Rayo Majadahonda (3)
 Real Unión (3)
 Tarazona (4)
 Toledo (3)
 UCAM Murcia (3)
 UD San Fernando (4)
 Villanovense (3)

Winners of Autonomous Communities tournaments
 Alavés B (4)
 Ardoi (4)
 Betis Deportivo (3)
 Burgos (3)
 Cartagena B (4)
 Escobedo (4)
 Huétor Tájar (4)
 Langreo (4)
 Mallorca B (4)
 Ontinyent (3)
 Plasencia (4)
 San Sebastián de los Reyes (3)
 SD Logroñés (4)
 Silva (4)
 Tenerife B (4)
 Utebo (4)
 Vilafranca (4)
 Villarrobledo (4)

(3) Team playing in 2017–18 Segunda División B (third tier)
(4) Team playing in 2017–18 Tercera División (fourth tier)
Slashed teams withdrew from the competition.
Team in bold won the competition

Round of 32
The draw for the first round was held on 31 October 2017. The matches were played between 29 November and 13 December 2017.

|}

 Escobedo and  Vilafranca received a bye.

First leg

Second leg

Round of 16
The draw for the round of 16 was held on 15 December 2017. The matches were played between 10 and 24 January 2018.

|}

First leg

Second leg

Quarterfinals
The draw for the quarterfinals was held on 26 January 2018. Matches were played between 7 and 21 February 2018.

|}

First leg

Second leg

Semifinals
The draw for the semifinals was held on 23 February 2018. Matches were played between 7 and 14 March 2018.

|}

First leg

Second leg

Final
Final will be played between 4 and 11 April 2018.

|}

First leg

Second leg

References

External links
Royal Spanish Football Federation 

2017-18
3
2017–18 Segunda División B
2017–18 Tercera División